Prior to the 2012 elections the characteristic Greek political system was a two-party system. The historically dominant parties have been New Democracy and the Panhellenic Socialist Movement (PASOK). Under the electoral system a party needs to surpass a 3% threshold in the popular vote in order to enter parliament. The largest party gets a 50-seat bonus (out of 300 seats) ostensibly to ensure elections return viable governing majorities.

History

1915–1967

This period was mainly ruled between the Right wing and the Centre.

The major parties that emerged were the People’s Party and the Liberal Party. In 1926 the Communist Party of Greece (KKE), that would later define the Left for years, entered the parliament.

From 1950 to 1963 the predominant parties that won all the elections at this period, were the People’s Party (later Hellenic Rally) and the National Radical Union (ERE), both from the Right.

1974–2009

After the seven-year dictatorship ended, the former leader of ERE Konstantinos Karamanlis was called back from exile to form a new government and then created the New Democracy (ND) party. Monarchy was abolished in 1974 making the political parties the sole determinants of politics in Greece.

1974 also saw the establishment of a new party the Panhellenic Socialist Movement (PASOK) under Andreas Papandreou, representing a socialist ideology. For the decades to come, PASOK and New Democracy were the two parties that dominated greek politics, creating a formidable two-party system, with the communist party KKE coming third.

The party system during this period was characterised by strong bureaucratic clientelism.

2009–present

The global economic crisis that largely affected Greece, consequently had an impact in reshaping the party system that was stagnant for decades. We observe a decline in confidence for the two major traditional parties, that caused the end of the continuous two-party system and single-party governments. There is a new move towards the creation of coalitions and an increase in the number of parties entering parliament.

The party that rose through the crisis was the Coalition of the Radical Left (SYRIZA). It finished second on the crucial May 2012 legislative elections and later won the 2015 elections. It was the first party from the Left wing in Greece's history to win an election.

A new cleavage in the party system ideology that was created during the economic crisis and was evident in the 2012 elections was a pro- or anti-European stance. This resulted in an unprecedented coalition between the major traditional parties New Democracy and PASOK, and the minor party DIMAR. Similarly, the coalition that was created after the 2015 elections between SYRIZA, a left wing party, and ANEL, a populist right party, was based on their common views regarding Europe.

This period of turmoil also saw the rise of the controversial far-right party Golden Dawn. It became a third party in parliament after the 2015 elections.

In 2018 the past major party PASOK merged with other centrist parties and created the Movement of Change (KINAL) formation.

The elections in 2019 saw a return to a single party government with the continuously dominant New Democracy claiming the majority in parliament.

Parties represented in the current Parliament and European Parliament

Minor parties

Defunct parties

Parties during the reign of King Otto (1833–1862) 
 English Party (liberal, pro-English) (1824–1863)
 French Party (liberal, pro-French) (1824–1863)
 Russian Party (conservative, pro-Russian) (1825–1863)
 Party of Radicals (radical, pro-union) (1848–1864) in the United States of the Ionian Islands

Parties during the reign of King George I (1863–1913) 
 Liberal Party (Liberal) (1910–1961)
 Nationalist Party (K.E.) – Komma Ethnikofronon, KE (conservative, nationalist) (1865–1909)
 Modernist Party (Ν.Κ.) – Neoteristikon Komma, ΝΚ (Liberal, Liberal Nationalist) (1875–1910)

Parties during the reign of King Constantine I - Alexander – George II (1913–1924) 

 Freethinkers' Party ( K.E.) – Komma Eleftherofronon (Nationalist, Royalist) (1922–1936)
 Liberal Party (Liberal, Liberal Nationalist) (1910–1961)
 People's Party ( Λ.Κ.) – Laiko Komma, LK (Conservative, Royalist) (1920–1958)

Parties during the Second Hellenic Republic (1924–1935) 
 Agrarian Party (A.K.) – Agrotikon Komma, AK (1926–1956)
 Conservative Democratic Party (Σ.Δ.Κ.) – Syntiritiko Demokratikon Komma, SDK (1932–1936)
 Democratic Union (Δ.E.) – Demokratiki Enosis (Liberal) (1926–?)
 Democratic Socialist Party of Greece (ΔΣΚ) – Demokratiko Sosialistiko Komma Ellados, DSK (Democratic Socialist) (1935–1950)
 Farmers' and Workers' Party (Α.Ε.Κ.) – Agrotikon kai Ergatikon Komma/Agrotergatiko Komma, AEK (Rural radical) (1932–1936)
 General People's Radical Union (Γ.Λ.Ρ.Ε) – Geniki Laiki Rizospastiki Enosis, GLRE (1932–1936)
 Liberal Party – Komma Fileleutheron (Liberal, Liberal Nationalist) (1910–1961)
 Greek National Socialist Party – Elliniko Ethniko Sosialistiko Komma (National Socialist) (1932)
 Jewish Political Union – Evraiki Politiki Enosi (1926–1932)
 Macedonian Union – Makedoniki Enosi (Conservative) (1935)
 National Radical Party (E.Ρ.K.) – Ethnikon Rizospastikon Komma, ERK (Conservative) (1932–1936)
 National Unionist Party (Ε.Ε.Κ.) – Ethnikon Enotikon Komma, EEK (1935–1950)
 People's Party (Λ.Κ.) – Laiko Komma, LK (Conservative, Royalist) (1920–1958)
 Progressive Party (Π.Κ.) – Proodeftikon Komma, PK (1928–1964, 1981)
 Refugees' Liberal Party (Φ.Π.Κ.) – Fileleftheron Prosfijikon Komma, FPK (1926–?)
 Socialist Party of Greece (ΣΚΕ) – Socialistikó Kómma Elládas, SKE (Socialist, Svolist) (1920–1953)
 Union of Royalists (EB) – Enosis Vasilikon (Monarchist-Conservative) (1935)

Parties during the restoration of King George II (1936–1946) 
 Agrarian Party (A.K.) – Agrotikon Komma, AK (1926–1956)
 Conservative Democratic Party (Σ.Δ.Κ.) – Syntiritiko Demokratikon Komma, SDK (1932–1936)
 Democratic Socialist Party of Greece (ΔΣΚ) – Demokratiko Sosialistiko Komma Ellados, DSK (Democratic Socialist) (1935–1950)
 Democratic Union (Δ.E.) – Demokratiki Enosis (Liberal) (1926–?)
 Farmers' and Workers' Party (Α.Ε.Κ.) – Agrotikon kai Ergatikon Komma/Agrotergatiko Komma, AEK (Rural radical) (1932–1936)
 General People's Radical Union (Γ.Λ.Ρ.Ε) – Geniki Laiki Rizospastiki Enosis, GLRE (??) (1932–1936)
 Liberal Party – Komma Fileleutheron (Liberal, Liberal Nationalist) (1910–1961)
 National Party of Greece (E.Κ.E.) – Ethnikon Komma Ellados, E.K.E. (Monarchist, Conservative) (1946–1967)
 National People's Party (E.Λ.Κ.) – Ethniko Laiko Komma, E.L.K. (1936)
 National Political Union (Ε.Π.Ε.) – Ethniki Politiki Enosis, E.P.E. (Liberal) (1946)
 National Radical Party (E.Ρ.K.) – Ethnikon Rizospastikon Komma, ERK (Conservative) (1932–1936)
 National Unionist Party (Ε.Ε.Κ.)– Ethnikon Enotikon Komma, EEK (1935–1950)
 People's Party (Λ.Κ.) – Laiko Komma, LK (Conservative, Royalist) (1920–1958)
 Progressive Party (Π.Κ.) – Proodeftikon Komma, PK (1928–1964, 1981)
 Reform Party (M.K.) – Metarrythmistikon Komma, MK (1936)
 Union of Agrarian Parties (Ε.Α.Κ.) – Enosis Agrotikon Kommaton, EAK (Agrarian) (1946)
 Union of the Nationally Minded (Ε.Ε.) – Enosis Ethnikofronon, ΕΕ (Monarchist, Conservative) (1946)
 United Order of Patriot-Thinkers (Η.Π.Ε.) – Inomeni Parataxis Ethnikofronon, I.P.E. (Conservative) (1946)

Parties during the reigns of Kings Paul and Constantine II (1946–1973) 
 4th of August Party – Kómma 4is Avgoústou, Κ4Α (Nationalist) (1965–1977)
 Center Union – Enosi Kentrou, E.K. (Liberal) (1961–1967)
 Christian Democracy – Christianikē Dēmokratia (socialist) (1963)
 Communist Party of Greece (Interior) – KKE Esoterikou (Eurocommunism) (1968–1986)
 Democratic Socialist Party of Greece (ΔΣΚ) – Demokratiko Sosialistiko Komma Ellados, DSK (Democratic Socialist) (1935–1950)
 Greek Rally (Ε.Σ.) – Ellinikos Synagermos, E.S. (Conservative, Royalist) (1951–1956)
 Politically Independent Alignment (Π.Α.Π.) – Politiki Anexartitos Parataxis, PAP (Metaxist) (1950–?) 
 Left Liberals (Α.Φ.) – Aristeroi Fileleutheroi, AF (communist) (1950–?)
 Liberal Democratic Center (Φ.Δ.Κ.) – Filelefthero Dimokratiko Kentro, FDK (Liberal) (1965–1966)
 Liberal Democratic Union (Φ.Δ.Ε.) (1956–1957)
 Liberal Party (Liberal, Liberal Nationalist) (1910–1961)
 Movement for Democracy and Socialism – (socialist) (1963)
 National Party of Greece (E.Κ.E.) – Ethnikon Komma Ellados, E.K.E. (Monarchist-Conservative) (1946–1967)
 National Progressive Center Union (E.Π.Ε.Κ.) – Ethniki Proodeutiki Enosi Kentrou, EPEK (1952)
 National Progressive Party (Δ.Π.Κ.) – Dimokratiko Proodeutiko Komma, DPK (1950–?)
 National Radical Union (E.Ρ.E.) – Ethniki Rizospastiki Enosis, E.R.E. (Conservative, Royalist) (1955–1967)
 New Party (N.K.) – Neo Komma, NK (conservative) (1947–1951)
 Pandemocratic Agrarian Front – Pandimokratikon Agrotikon Metopon (Socialist) (1961)
 Party of Christian Democracy (1956)
 Party of I. Sofianopoulos – Komma tou I. Sofianopoulou (communist) (1950–?)
 Party of Progressive Liberals – Komma ton Prodethikon Fileleutheron (liberal) (1950–?)
 People's Social Party (Λ.Κ.Κ.) – Laikon Koinonikon Komma, LKK (1955)
 Progressive Party (Π.Κ.) – Proodeftikon Komma, PK (1928–1964, 1981)
 Progressive Rural Democratic Union (1958)
 Rally of Farmers and Workers – ?? (Agrarian) (1951–1952)
 Socialist Party-Democratic Popular Union (Σ.Κ.-Ε.Λ.Δ.) – Sosialistiko Komma-Enosi Laikis Dimokratias, SK-ELD (Socialist) (1950–1952)
 Union of the People's Party (1958)
 United Democratic Left (Ε.Δ.Α. – Eniaia Dimokratiki Aristera, EDA (Communist) (1951–1977)

Parties during the Third Hellenic Republic (1974–present) 
 Center Union - New Forces – Enosi Kentrou-Nees Dynameis (Social Democratic, Liberal) (1974–1977)
 Democratic Alignment (Δ.Π.) – Dimokratiki Parataxi, DP (1977)
 Democratic Alliance (ΔΗ.ΣΥ.) – Dimokratiki Symmahia, DS (Centrist, Neoliberal) (2010–2012)
 Democratic Left (ΔΗΜ.ΑΡ.) – Dimokratiki Aristera, DA (Social Democratic, Democratic Socialist) (2010–2022)
 Democratic Renewal (DH.ANA) – Dimokratiki Ananeosi, DIANA (Conservative) (1985–1994)
 Democratic Revival (Δ.Α.) – Dimokratiki Anagenissi, DA (National Conservative, Christian Socialist) (2003–?)
 Democrat Socialists' Movement – Kinima Demokraton Sostialiston (2015–?)
 Drassi (Liberalism, Classical liberalism, Postnationalism, Decentralization, Economic liberalism) (2009–2019)
 Drachmi Greek Democratic Movement Five Stars (Patriotic Socialism,Eurosceptic,Single-issue politics,Populism) (2013–2015)
 Ecologists of Greece  (Ο.Ε.) – Oikologoi Elladas, OE (Green conservative, Right-wing populist) (1988–?)
 Greek Left (Eurocommunism, Radicalism, (Democratic Socialist) (1987–1992)
 Hellenic Front – Elliniko Metopo (Nationalist, Rightist) (1994–2004)
 Hellenic Women's Political Party – Komma Ellinidon Ginaikon (Feminist) (?–?)
 Left Radical Movement – Aristeri Rizospastiki Kinisi, A.R.K. (Socialism) (2015–2021)
 Liberal Democratic Union-Socialist Party (Φ.Δ.Ε.-Σ.Κ.) (1974)
 Liberal Party (Κόμμα Φιλελευθέρων) (1980–2012)
 The Liberals – Oi Fileleftheroi (Liberal) (1999–2004)
 Movement of Free Citizens (Κ.Ε.Π.) – Kinima Eleftheron Politon, K.E.P. (Liberal, Liberal Conservative) (2001–2002)
 Movement for a United Communist Party of Greece (ΚΚΕ) (Communist) (1993–1996)
 National Alignment (Ε.Π.)- Ethniki Parataxis, E.P. (Nationalist, Royalist) (1977–1981)
 National Creation (- Ethniki Dhmiourgia, (Rightist, Nationalist) (2022–?)
 National Democratic Union – Ethniki Dimokratiki Enosis (Rightist) (1974)
 National Political Union (Ε.Π.ΕΝ.) – Ethniki Politiki Enosis, E.P.EN. (Rightist, Nationalist) (1984–1996)
 Organisation of Communists Marxists-Leninists of Greece (ΟΚΜΛΕ) (Communist, Maoist) (1982–1993)
 Panathinaikos Movement ( ΠΑΝ.ΚΙ)(2012–)
 Panhellenic Macedonian Front (2009)
 Panhellenic Socialist Movement (Greek: Πανελλήνιο Σοσιαλιστικό Κίνημα) – Panellínio Sosialistikó Kínima (Social Democratic, Centre-left)  (1974-?)
 Party of Democratic Socialism (ΚΟΔΗΣΟ) – Komma tou Dimokratikou Sosialismou, KODISO (social democratic, democratic socialist) (1979–1989)
 Party of Hellenism – Komma Ellinismou (Nationalist, Populist) (1984–2004)
 Party of New Liberals (K.N.) – Komma ton Neofileftheron, KN (Liberal, Liberal Conservative) (1977–1978)
 Patriotic Alliance (Greek: Πατριωτική Συμμαχία) – Patriotiki Symmachia, PATRI.S. (Nationalist, Far Right) (2004–2007)
 Peoples Democratic Unity – LDE (1977)
 Political Spring – POL.AN (Conservative, Nationalist) (1993–2004)
 Popular Union of Bipartisan Social Groups – LEFKO (Populist) (1989–?)
 Progress and Left Forces Alliance (Democratic socialism, Christian socialism, Eurocommunism, Radicalism) (1977–1981)
 Progressive Party (Π.Κ.) – Proodeftikon Komma, PK (1928–1964, 1981)
 Front Line – Proti Grammi (Nationalist) (1999–?)
 Radical Left Front – ME.R.A. (Radical Left) (1999–2009)
 Radical Movement of Social Democratic Alliance – RIKSSY (Social democracy) (2012–2013)
 Rainbow (Slavic Macedonian: Виножито Vinožito) (1994–?)
 Reformers for Democracy and Development (Μεταρρυθμιστές της Αριστεράς για τη Δημοκρατία και την Ανάπτυξη) (2014–?)
 Republican Union (Δ.Ε.) – Dimokratiki Enosis, DE
 Revolutionary Communist Party of Greece – Epanastatiko Koumounistiko Komma Ellados, EKKE (Communist) (1974–?)
 Union for the Homeland and the People – Enosi gia tin Patrida kai ton Lao , EPAL (Christian Democracy) (2014–2015)
 United Democratic Left – Eniaia Dimokratiki Aristera (Democratic socialism, Communism, Pacifism) (1951–1977)
 United Left (Communism, Democratic socialism, Eurocommunism) (1974–1977)
 United Nationalist Movement (ΕΝ.Ε.Κ.) – Eniaio Ethnikistiko Kinima, ENEK (Extreme Right, Nationalist) (1979–1989)
 United Socialist Alignment of Greece (Ε.Σ.Π.Ε.) – Eniaia Sosialistiki Parataxi Elladas (Socialist) (1984–1989)
 Golden Dawn – Laïkós Sýndesmos – Chrysí Avgí (Ultranationalism) (1993–2020, banned)

See also 
 Politics of Greece
 Elections in Greece

Further reading 
 

 

 Here Are The Parties That Really Matter In Greece's Upcoming Election via Bloomberg Politics. Retrieved 24 January 2015.

References

Greece
 
parties
Political parties
Greece